Bonanomi is an Italian surname. Notable people with the surname include:

Marco Bonanomi (born 1985), Italian racing driver
Roberta Bonanomi (born 1966), Italian cyclist

Italian-language surnames